Little Sunapee Lake (or "Little Lake Sunapee", a frequent local usage) is a  water body located primarily in Merrimack County in central New Hampshire, United States, in the town of New London. A small portion of the lake crosses into neighboring Springfield in Sullivan County. The lake is sometimes referred to as "Twin Lakes" due to a long, narrow peninsula which nearly cuts the lake in half. Water flowing out of the lake passes through Goose Pond and Otter Pond before entering Lake Sunapee. Bucklin Beach is a Town of New London recreation area at the east end of the lake.

The lake is classified as a warmwater fishery and contains rainbow trout, smallmouth bass, chain pickerel, and horned pout.

See also

List of lakes in New Hampshire

References

Lakes of Merrimack County, New Hampshire
Lakes of Sullivan County, New Hampshire
Lakes of New Hampshire
New London, New Hampshire
Sunapee, Little